Payal Malhotra (born 28 March 1980) is an Indian actress and producer. She has appeared in Hindi Films and Indian television series. She acted in Malayalam movie Keerthi Chakra in 2006. She is best known for her roles in Bollywood films Kaho Na Pyaar Hai 

She was also seen in the Bollywood films Hum Tumhare hai sanam, 
Heera Lal Panna Lal, and Aag Hi Aag.

Filmography
Worked as Sheetal Pager in Benaam (1999).

References

External links
 

Indian film actresses
1976 births
Living people
Actresses from Delhi
Hindi film producers
Actresses in Malayalam cinema